Tommy Ord (15 October 1952 – 15 December 2020) was an English retired professional football forward. Nearly all of his pro career was spent in North America.

In 1973, Ord transferred to Montreal Olympique of the North American Soccer League. The Olympique sent Ord to the Rochester Lancers before the 1974 season. In 1975, Ord began the season with the Lancers before being traded to the New York Cosmos mid season. In 1976, the Cosmos sent him to the Vancouver Whitecaps. In 1977 they traded Ord to the Seattle Sounders toward the end of the season. Ord picked up a yellow card and scored Seattle's only goal in a 2–1 loss to the Cosmos in Soccer Bowl '77. In 1977, he was named to the Rochester Lancers Team of the Decade.

Just prior to the 1980 season, the Sounders sent Ord, Bruce Rudroff and cash to the Tulsa Roughnecks in exchange for Jack Brand, Roger Davies and David Nish. He also played briefly for the Phoenix Inferno in the Major Indoor Soccer League.

Following his retirement, Ord continued to play for various amateur teams including Matador F.C. He also worked for American Express in New York City.

References

External links
 
 NASL/MISL Stats
 1979 Seattle Sounders Player Profile

1952 births
2020 deaths
Atlanta Chiefs players
Buffalo Stallions players
Chelsea F.C. players
English footballers
English expatriate footballers
Major Indoor Soccer League (1978–1992) players
Montreal Olympique players
North American Soccer League (1968–1984) indoor players
New York Cosmos players
North American Soccer League (1968–1984) players
Phoenix Inferno players
Rochester Lancers (1967–1980) players
Seattle Sounders (1974–1983) players
Tulsa Roughnecks (1978–1984) players
Vancouver Whitecaps (1974–1984) players
Erith & Belvedere F.C. players
Expatriate soccer players in Canada
English expatriate sportspeople in Canada
Expatriate soccer players in the United States
English expatriate sportspeople in the United States
Footballers from Greater London
Association football forwards